Agrotera scissalis is a moth in the family Crambidae. It was described by Francis Walker in 1866. It is found on Java.

References

Moths described in 1866
Spilomelinae
Moths of Indonesia